Newbigging is a hamlet in South Lanarkshire, Scotland. It is near Dunsyre at the southern end of the Pentland Hills. It is on the A72 Carnwath to Peebles road.

References 

Villages in South Lanarkshire